Tzath II was King of Lazica as a Byzantine client from 556 to an unknown date. 

He was the younger brother of Gubazes II, who was assassinated by Byzantine generals in autumn 555. At the time, Tzath resided at the Byzantine capital, Constantinople, and the Lazi sent a delegation to the Byzantine emperor Justinian I (r. 527–565) to request both justice for their murdered king and the confirmation of Tzath as their new king (the Lazic rulers, as client kings, had to have their accession confirmed by the emperor, who awarded them with their regalia). Tzath arrived in Lazica in spring 556, accompanied by the magister militum Soterichus, and was received in an elaborately staged welcome ceremony. Nothing further is known of him.

Tzath II is the last known ruler of the dynasty of the kings of Lazica. After the Byzantine–Iranian treaty of 561/562, that ended the Lazic War, Lazica gradually disappears from the sources.Toumanoff (1963), p. 255.

References

Sources
 
 
 
 Toumanoff, Cyril (1963). Studies in Christian Caucasian History, p. 269. Georgetown University Press.

6th-century births
6th-century monarchs in Europe
Kings of Lazica
Year of death unknown